Kuna is a city in Ada County, Idaho. It is part of the Boise metropolitan area. The population was 24,011 at the time of the 2020 census.

Kuna is one of the fastest-growing areas in Idaho, having nearly tripled in population between 2000 and 2010, and a nearly additional 60 percent gain between 2010 and 2020.

History
Kuna originated as a railroad stop with coach transport to Boise. It is popularly believed, as cited by the Kuna Chamber of Commerce, that the translation of the name "Kuna" means "the end of the trail", but Charles S. Walgamott cites the origin of the name as a Shoshone Indian word meaning "green leaf, good to smoke."

The Western Heritage Historic Byway, designated as a national as well as a state scenic byway, travels around a number of historic sites in the area.

Geography

South of Kuna is the Kuna Caves a lava tube.

A small seasonal creek, Indian Creek, runs through the city. It is now used as an irrigation canal, filled by the New York Canal from the Boise River Diversion Dam. One of the few small floatable waterways in the region, Indian Creek is a favorite swimming spot for local residents.

Demographics

As of the 2020 census, the median income for a household in the city was $68,017. Families had a median income of $75,296 versus $91,364 for married-couple families and $33,512 for nonfamily households. About 7.4% of those aged 18 to 64 years and 8.0% of the total population were below the poverty line, including 7.8% of those under age 18 and 14.5% of those age 65 or over.

2010 census
As of the census of 2010, there were 15,210 people, 4,782 households, and 3,838 families residing in the city. The racial makeup of the city was 91.2% White, 0.6% African American, 0.8% Native American, 0.7% Asian, 0.1% Pacific Islander, 3.6% from other races, and 2.9% from two or more races. Hispanic or Latino people of any race were 8.6% of the population.

There were 4,782 households, of which 56.1% had children under the age of 18 living with them, 63.3% were married couples living together, 11.9% had a female householder with no husband present, 5.1% had a male householder with no wife present, and 19.7% were non-families. 14.8% of all households were made up of individuals, and 3.9% had someone living alone who was 65 years of age or older. The average household size was 3.18 and the average family size was 3.53.

The median age in the city was 28.1 years. 37.7% of residents were under the age of 18; 7.4% were between the ages of 18 and 24; 35.1% were from 25 to 44; 15.3% were from 45 to 64; and 4.4% were 65 years of age or older. The gender makeup of the city was 49.9% male and 50.1% female.

Arts and culture
During the first weekend in August, there is an annual celebration called Kuna Days. Regular festivities include vendors in the park, live music at the bandshell, a free kids carnival, a rubber duck race in Indian Creek, a BBQ fundraiser at the fire station, a parade, a street dance, and a fireworks show.

The Snake River Birds of Prey Festival is held every year in mid-May. Taking advantage of the nearby Morley Nelson Snake River Birds of Prey National Conservation Area, which holds North America's densest population of nesting raptors, it offers lectures and tours about raptors, as well as about local history.

Parks and recreation
In the city center is Colonel Bernard Fisher Veteran's Memorial Park, named after one of the city's most notable residents.

Notable people
Bernard Fisher, awarded the Medal of Honor
Robin Fontes, Army Major general and highest-ranking woman in Afghanistan
Bill Sali, former member of the United States House of Representatives
Ingrid Wilhite, filmmaker

Notes

External links
 
 Kuna Chamber of Commerce

Cities in Ada County, Idaho
Cities in Idaho
Boise metropolitan area